The Bosun is a 14-foot GRP sailing dinghy originally created for the Royal Navy by designer Ian Proctor and built by Bossoms Boatyard in 1963. The design specification was for a robust dinghy, able to handle open seas, capable of carrying a crew of 3 to 4 people and be fast enough for a competent helm to enjoy sailing, whilst stable enough for a beginner to learn on.

The sailmark is a boatswain's call.

References

Dinghies
Boats designed by Ian Proctor